Dundahera is a census town in Gurgaon district  in the state of Haryana, India. It lies near Udyog Vihar Industrial Area adjacent to Delhi-Gurgaon Border. It has a population of about 122016 persons living in around 2739 households.

Demographics
 India census, Dundahera had a population of 10,640. Males constitute 59% of the population and females 41%. Dundahera has an average literacy rate of 76%, higher than the national average of 59.5%: male literacy is 83% and, female literacy is 66%. In Dundahera, 12% of the population is under 6 years of age. The village forms largest chunk of municipal Ward No.4 of Municipal Corporation of Gurgaon.  The present Municipal Councillor from this ward is Mr. Virender Yadav who got elected after the electoral process held in April–May, 2011 for the first ever elections of Municipal Corporation of Gurgaon.

References

Cities and towns in Gurgaon district